Karam (/Karma) is a 2005 Indian Hindi-language action thriller film directed by cinematographer Sanjay F. Gupta, in his directorial debut. Starring John Abraham, Priyanka Chopra and Bharat Dabholkar, the film follows John, a professional assassin who ends up unintentionally killing an innocent family during a mission and becomes traumatized, eventually tendering his resignation. This does not go down well with his boss, who kidnaps John's wife and holds her hostage. In order to win back her freedom, John must complete one last job: killing some of the city's top men within a limited period of time. The film co-stars Vishwajeet Pradhan, Shiney Ahuja, Murli Sharma, Rajesh Khera and Aanjjan Srivastav.

Having directed several music videos, Gupta decided to direct the film after being impressed with the script written by Suparn Verma. Confirming that it was not inspired by any Hong Kong film, Gupta decided to do his own take on it despite feeling the script was not novel. With a strong feeling that John Abraham suited the role from the beginning, Gupta cast him as the lead alongside Priyanka Chopra, and named the protagonist after Abraham. Producer Harry Baweja revealed the film was based on a true story and shot entirely in Mumbai.

Karam was released theatrically on 11 March 2005, opening to mixed reviews from critics and audiences. It was a commercial failure both domestically and in the overseas. In 2011 during an interview for his film Force, John Abraham revealed a number of people came up and told him Karam was their favorite film.

Plot

The film begins with Shalini narrating how much she loved John despite of knowing he was a contract killer and how things might have been different had he not picked up a gun. The film goes into flashback mode, and John is shown to be an assassin working for a mobster named Captain. Accompanied by two friends Kaif and Bull, he is assigned a hit, which he carries out, but also ends up killing an entire family, who arrives untimely to the house from where the hit was planned. Apart from the adults, one of their daughters gets shot unintentionally by John. He gets traumatized, and despite his friends telling him to move on, he becomes guilt-ridden and explains everything to Shalini, with whom he plans to escape away. The city's toughest cop, Wagh, starts investigating the murder and, in the process, comes close to the surviving daughter of the deceased family.

Meanwhile, Captain is attacked by the rival don, Yunus, and as a result decides to teach the city a lesson by killing the city's top industrialist, top film producer, the cop backing Yunus and Yunus himself; so that everyone else falls in line and no one dreams of becoming another Yunus. He decides that John must carry out this plan of his. To achieve this, he takes Shalini hostage. John is given 36 hours to kill the five targets on the hit list. John re-unites with his friends but struggles to carry out the hits initially due to still being traumatized. He, however, manages to kill the targets one by one, while his wife tries to escape in order to stop him from killing. Kaif, however, gets killed by Wagh after John manages to kill a few more targets. Shalini slashes her wrist and is admitted to a hospital, where she realizes she's pregnant and manages to escape. She manages to contact John, who arrives to pick her up, only to find himself trapped when she gets taken hostage once again. Realizing that he has been double-crossed, John shoots Bull in front of Captain, who reminds him of the remaining time he has.

John meets Wagh and asks for his help in exchange for providing all evidence against Captain, to which Wagh agrees. Along with sub-inspector Naik, he arrives on the spot and, after a gunfight, manages to free Shalini. John, on the other hand, meets Yunus and his friend, DCP Patil. He blackmails Patil into bringing him Shalini, which he does. However, John kills both Yunus and Patil, escaping with Shalini. A chase ensues, resulting in a rough fight between John and Captain. John manages to kill Captain and his team, but when one of his surviving members tries to shoot, John shoots him, and himself gets shot unintentionally by Naik, the same way John mistakenly shot the young girl. He breathes his last near Shalini, who gets shattered by his death.

The film ends with the story returning to the present time, where Shalini is happily playing with two kids: her son and the daughter of the family John killed, whom she adopted.

Cast
 John Abraham as John Wargas 
 Priyanka Chopra as Shalini Wargas, John's wife
 Bharat Dabholkar as Captain
 Vishwajeet Pradhan as Yunus
 Shiney Ahuja as ACP Wagh
 Murli Sharma as Kaif
 Rajesh Khera as Bull
 Aanjjan Srivastav as DCP Patil
 Nitin Arora
 Bikramjeet Kanwarpal

Soundtrack

The music was composed by Vishal–Shekhar and Pankaj Awasthi. The lyrics were penned by Vishal Dadlani, Irshad Kamil, Dev Kohli, Pankaj Awasthi, Amit Mishra and Harshdeep.

Track listing

References

External links
 
 

2005 films
2000s Hindi-language films
2005 action drama films
2005 action thriller films
Indian action drama films
Indian action thriller films
Indian crime action films
Gun fu films
Indian films based on actual events
Action films based on actual events
Crime films based on actual events
Drama films based on actual events
Thriller films based on actual events
Films scored by Vishal–Shekhar
Indian films with live action and animation
Films about contract killing in India